Oldfieldthomasiidae is an extinct family of notoungulate mammals known from the Late Paleocene to Late Eocene of South America. The family was classified by George Gaylord Simpson in 1945 and a synonym is Acoelodidae, defined by Florentino Ameghino in 1901.

Etymology 
The family is named after British zoologist Oldfield Thomas.

Fossils 
Fossils of the family Oldfieldthomasiidae have been found in southern South America, in Argentina, Bolivia, Brazil and Chile.

References 

Typotheres
Prehistoric mammal families
Paleogene mammals of South America
Paleocene first appearances
Eocene extinctions
Taxa named by George Gaylord Simpson